
Cabrera is a Spanish surname. It is the feminine form of "cabrero", meaning goatherd. Notable people with the surname include:

A 
 Al Cabrera (1881–1964), Spanish baseball player
 Alex Cabrera (born 1971), Venezuelan baseball player
 Ana Cabrera (born 1982), American journalist and television news anchor 
 Analí Cabrera (1959–2011), Peruvian actress, vedette, and athlete
 Ángel Cabrera (naturalist) (1879–1960), Spanish zoologist
 Ángel Cabrera (born 1969), Argentinian professional golfer
 Asdrúbal Cabrera (born 1985), Venezuelan baseball player in Major League Baseball

B 
 Benedicto Cabrera aka Ben Cabrera or BenCab (born 1952), Filipino painter
 Bernardo de Cabrera (1289–1364), Aragonese military man and diplomat 
 Blas Cabrera Navarro (born 1946), American physicist
 Blas Cabrera Felipe (1878–1945), Spanish physicist
 Boris Cabrera (born 1980), Spanish-American actor and personal trainer

C 
 Candice "Black" Cabrera, reality show contestant and model
 Carlos Humberto Cabrera (born 1973), Colombian road cyclist 
 César Benito Cabrera, US ambassador to Mauritius and Seychelles
 Conrado Cabrera (born 1967),  Cuban track cyclist

D 
 Daniel Cabrera (born 1981), Dominican baseball pitcher
 Delfo Cabrera (1919–1981), Argentinian athlete, 1948 Olympic medalist
 Diana Cabrera (born 1984), Canadian-Uruguayan sport shooter
 Dolores Cabrera y Heredia (1828–1899), Spanish writer

E 
 Edward Cabrera (born 1998), Dominican baseball player
 Everth Cabrera (born 1986), Nicaraguan baseball player

F 
 Fernando Cabrera (baseball) (born 1981), Puerto Rican baseball pitcher
 Francisco Cabrera (baseball), Dominican Major League Baseball player
 Francisco Cabrera (cyclist), Chilean track and road cyclist

G 
 Geles Cabrera (born 1929), Mexican sculptor
 Génesis Cabrera (born 1996), Dominican baseball player
 Guillermo Cabrera Infante, Cuban author

J 
 James Ernesto Morales Cabrera (born 1969), changed his name to Jimmy Morales, President of Guatemala
 Joaquina Cabrera (1836–1908), de facto First Lady of Guatemala and mother of Guatemalan President Manuel Estrada Cabrera
 Jolbert Cabrera (born 1972), Colombian baseball player
 José Cabrera (baseball), Dominican baseball player
 José Antonio Cabrera (1768–1820), Argentine statesman
 José Ramón Balaguer Cabrera (1932–2022), Cuban politician
 Juan Bautista Cabrera (1837–1916), Spanish bishop of the Reformed Church

L 
 Leandro Cabrera (born 1991), Uruguayan footballer
 Lisandro Cabrera (born 1998), Argentine footballer
 Luis Cabrera Lobato (1876–1954), Mexican lawyer, politician and writer
 Lydia Cabrera (1899–1991), Cuban anthropologist and poet

M 
 Manuel Estrada Cabrera (1857–1923), President of Guatemala from 1898 to 1920
 María Luisa Cabrera (1904–1989), Mexican artist
 Matías Cabrera (born 1986), Uruguayan football player
 Melky Cabrera (born 1984), Dominican baseball player in Major League Baseball
 Miguel Cabrera (painter) (1695–1768), Mexican painter
 Miguel Cabrera (born 1983), Venezuelan baseball player in Major League Baseball
 Miguel Cabrera Cabrera (born 1948), Spanish architect and politician
 Mónica Cabrera (born 1958), Argentine actress, director, and playwright

N 
 Nelson Cabrera (disambiguation)
 Nicolás Cabrera (1913–1989), Spanish physicist

O 
 Orlando Cabrera (born 1974), Colombian baseball player
 Oswaldo Cabrera (born 1999), Venezuelan baseball player

P 
 Pedro Cabrera (1938–2002), Cuban actor
 Pedro García Cabrera (1905–1981), Spanish writer

R 
 Ramón Cabrera y Griñó (1806–1877), Spanish Carlist military officer
 Ramón Cabrera (baseball) (born 1989), Venezuelan baseball player
 Rosario Cabrera (1901-1975), Mexican painter
 Ryan Cabrera (born 1982), American pop-rock musician

S 
 Sandra Cabrera (1970–2004), Argentinian trade unionist
 Santiago Cabrera, Chilean actor

V 
 Vicente Cabrera Funes (1944-2014), Ecuadorian writer and professor

See also
 Cabrera (disambiguation)
 Cabrero (disambiguation)

Occupational surnames

Spanish-language surnames